Landscape with Animals is a 1767 painting by Philip James de Loutherbourg. It is now in the Musée des Beaux-Arts of Strasbourg, France. Its inventory number is 1062. The painting was much admired by Denis Diderot, an early patron of Loutherbourg, when it was shown at the Paris Salon of 1767. Although Diderot found the clouds unconvincing – as heavy and solid as lapis lazuli – he heaped enormous praise on the depiction of the animals, especially the white cow at the centre of the composition.

References

External links

Paintings in the collection of the Musée des Beaux-Arts de Strasbourg
Oil on canvas paintings
1767 paintings
Rococo paintings
Landscape paintings
Cattle in art
Sheep in art
Goats in art
Donkeys in art
Dogs in art
Animal paintings
Paintings by Philip James de Loutherbourg